Memoirs of the Elephant Man is the debut album by the American rapper Busdriver. It was released in 1999 on Temporary Whatever. It was rereleased in 2001.

Critical reception
Cincinnati CityBeat called the album "exquisitely weird and wonderfully heavy."

Track listing

References

External links
 Memoirs of the Elephant Man on Alpha Pup Records

1999 debut albums
Busdriver albums